Psettodes erumei, commonly known as the Indian halibut or adalah, is a species of flounder found in the Indian and Pacific Oceans, from the Red Sea to northern Australia.

Like other members of its family, it is regarded as one of the most primitive flatfish, having a thicker, less compressed body and a migrated eye that is at the edge of the head rather than fully on top.

The adalah differs from its relatives, such as Psettodes belcheri, by having spiny rays in front of the dorsal fins. It also has multiple stripes along the top of its body, which can range from slightly lighter than its main body colour to a pale white.

Pleuronectiformes